Sennhof is a quarter in the district 3 of Winterthur.

It was formerly a part of Seen municipality, which was incorporated into Winterthur in 1922.

Sennhof-Kyburg railway station is a stop of the Zurich S-Bahn service S26.

Winterthur